Marca Futsal is a futsal club based in Castelfranco Veneto, Treviso Italy. The club was founded in 2005 as "Marca Trevigiana C5" and changes denominationation in 2009; its stadium is Palasport PalaMazzalovo of Montebelluna with 1,100 seaters.

Honours
2  Serie A: 2010–11, 2012–13
1  Coppa Italia: 2010
2  Supercoppa Italiana: 2010, 2011
1 Campionato Serie A2: 2007

Roster 2012/2013

UEFA club competitions record

UEFA Futsal Cup

External links
Official Website

Futsal clubs in Italy
Sport in Veneto
Futsal clubs established in 2005
2005 establishments in Italy